Gleedsville is an unincorporated village in Loudoun County, Virginia. Gleedsville lies south of Leesburg on Gleedsville Road. According to the Geographic Names Information System, the village has also been known as Leedsville.

Unincorporated communities in Loudoun County, Virginia
Washington metropolitan area
Unincorporated communities in Virginia